Chrislea Aircraft Limited was a British aircraft manufacturer, formed in 1936 and closed in 1952.

History

The company was formed on 2 October 1936 at Heston Aerodrome near London, England, to build the designs of Richard Christoforides. The company name was derived from the partners Christoforides and Bernard Victor Leak. The first product was the Airguard which first flew in 1938. The Ace first flew in 1946 and soon after in April 1947 the company moved to Exeter International Airport (due to the closure of Heston). At Exeter the Super Ace and Skyjeep were produced, but the aircraft did not sell well due to resistance to the unusual control wheel used. The Managing Director and Chief Designer R.C. Christoforides left the company after internal problems, reduced demand and low production levels, with the assets of the company being bought by C.E.Harper Aircraft Limited in 1952, which scrapped all partly constructed and non-flown aircraft (Seven Super Aces and two Skyjeeps).

Aircraft designs
Chrislea Airguard
Chrislea Ace
Chrislea Super Ace
Chrislea Skyjeep

References

 The Illustrated Encyclopedia of Aircraft (Part Work 1982–1985). London: Orbis Publishing. 
 Jackson, A.J. British Civil Aircraft Since 1919 Volume 1. London: Putnam, 1974. . 
 Smith, Ron. British Built Aircraft Greater London. London: Tempus Publishing, 2002. .

External links
Chrislea – British Aircraft Directory

Defunct aircraft manufacturers of the United Kingdom
Vehicle manufacturing companies established in 1936
1936 establishments in England
Vehicle manufacture in London
Vehicle manufacturing companies disestablished in 1952
1952 disestablishments in England
British companies disestablished in 1952
British companies established in 1936